CDH23 antisense RNA 1 is a protein that in humans is encoded by the CDH23-AS1 gene.

References

Further reading